Shunqing District is a district of Nanchong city, Sichuan Province, China.

One campus of North Sichuan Medical University is in the district.

References

Districts of Sichuan
Nanchong